Manchester is a town in Grant County, Oklahoma, United States. The population was 103 at the 2010 census, a decline of 1.0 percent from 104 at the 2000 census.

Geography
Manchester is located in northwest Grant County just south of the Oklahoma-Kansas border along SH-132. The Atchison, Topeka and Santa Fe Railroad passes through the town.

Demographics

As of the census of 2000, there were 104 people, 47 households, and 29 families residing in the town. There were 58 housing units at an average density of 245.4 per square mile (93.3/km2). The racial makeup of the town was 99.04% White, and 0.96% from two or more races.

There were 47 households, out of which 29.8% had children under the age of 18 living with them, 57.4% were married couples living together, 2.1% had a female householder with no husband present, and 36.2% were non-families. 34.0% of all households were made up of individuals, and 17.0% had someone living alone who was 65 years of age or older. The average household size was 2.21 and the average family size was 2.87.

In the town, the population was spread out, with 21.2% under the age of 18, 3.8% from 18 to 24, 30.8% from 25 to 44, 25.0% from 45 to 64, and 19.2% who were 65 years of age or older. The median age was 44 years. For every 100 females, there were 92.6 males. For every 100 females age 18 and over, there were 100.0 males.

The median income for a household in the town was $27,500, and the median income for a family was $36,250. Males had a median income of $21,250 versus $15,500 for females. The per capita income for the town was $12,760. There were 5.6% of families and 6.7% of the population living below the poverty line, including no under eighteens and 23.1% of those over 64.

References

Towns in Grant County, Oklahoma
Towns in Oklahoma